A Northern Soul is the second studio album by English singer and actress Sheridan Smith. It was released by Warner Bros. on 2 November 2018, and debuted at number fifteen on the UK Albums Chart.

Critical reception
The Irish News rated the album 7/10.

Track listing

Charts

References

2018 albums
Sheridan Smith albums